BandSports is a Brazilian cable television network that has its programming based on all sports, launched in 2002 by Grupo Bandeirantes de Comunicação.

Sports Programming

Football 
 Campeonato Carioca

Athletics 
 Diamond League
 European Athletics Championship

Basketball 
 EuroLeague
 Campeonato Paulista de Basquete
 Campeonato Brasileiro de Basquete

Combat Sports 
 Standout Fighting Tournament
 Jungle Fight
 WGP Kickboxing
 Boxing for You
 Prime Kickboxing
 BWF

Cycling 
 Campeonato Brasileiro de Mountain Bike
 Copa Internacional de Mountain Bike

Equestrianism 
 Longines Xtreme Teams Challenge

Futsal 
 Campeonato Catarinense de Futsal
 Liga Paulista de Futsal
 Liga Feminina de Futsal do Brasil
 Liga Nacional de Futsal do Brasil
 Copa do Brasil de Futsal

Motorsports 
 AMG Cup Brasil
 Copa Truck
 Formula 1
 Formula 2
 Formula 3
 Formula 4 Brazil
 Formula E
 Gold Classic
 Gold Turismo
 Grande Prêmio da Cidade de São Paulo 1000 Milhas
 Império Endurance Brasil
 MXGP
 NASCAR Brasil Sprint Race
 NASCAR Camping World Truck Series
 NASCAR Cup Series
 NASCAR Xfinity Series
 Porsche Supercup
 Stock Car Pro Series
 Stock Series
 Turismo Nacional Brasil
 Ultimate Drift
 World Superbike Championship
 Yamalube R3 bLU cRU Cup South America

Sailing 
 SailGP

Skateboarding 
 Liga Pro Skate Portugal

Tennis 
 Campeonato Paulista de Beach Tennis
 Circuito Beach Tennis BeBrasil

Volleyball 
 Circuito BandSports Zinzane de Vôlei de Praia

Programs broadcast by BandSports 
 Ace BandSports
 Acelerados
 Auto+
 Baita Amigos
 BandSports News
 Bola Rolando
 Depois do Jogo
 Doc BandSports
 Drops BandSports
 Drops CBT
 Encontro de Craques
 Esporte Agora
 Esporte Total
 G4
 Maratona BandSports
 Oléé S.A.
 Os Donos da Bola
 Primeiro Tempo
 Resenha do Galinho
 SuperMotor
 The Golf Brasil
 Tour da Bola
 Traduzindo F1
 Viva o Esporte

See also 
 Grupo Bandeirantes

External links 
 
 
 
 
 

Television stations in Brazil
Portuguese-language television stations in Brazil
Grupo Bandeirantes de Comunicação
Television channels and stations established in 2002
Sports television networks in Brazil
2002 establishments in Brazil